The 1987 1. divisjon was the 43rd completed season of top division football in Norway. The season began on 2 May 1987 and ended on 10 October 1987.

22 rounds were played. Number eleven and twelve were relegated. The winners of the two groups of the 2. divisjon were promoted, as well as the winner of a series of play-off matches between the two second placed teams in the two groups of the 2. divisjon and number ten in the 1. divisjon.

For the first time in the Norwegian top flight, three rather than two points were given for wins. There was also another, more controversial new rule for points: if a match was drawn, two points would be given to the winner of a penalty shootout, and one point to the loser of the shootout. This rule, suggested by Tom A. Schanke and appointed by the Norwegian Football Association in February 1987, was highly controversial and liquidated after the 1987 season. Note that if draws would end as draws with one point to each, as usual, Tromsø IL would have been placed 10th with a possibility of being relegated.

Overview
Moss FK, coached by Nils Arne Eggen, won the league for the first and, as of the 2019 season, last time. The victory was not settled until the final round of the league, with Moss beating runners-up Molde FK (who would have grabbed the gold if they defeated Moss) 2-0 at away grounds.

Teams and locations
''Note: Table lists in alphabetical order.

League table

Results
Results in brackets indicate the results from penalty shoot-outs whenever games were drawn.

Relegation play-offs
The qualification matches were contested between Hamarkameratene (10th in the 1. divisjon), Djerv 1919 (2nd in the 2. divisjon - Group A), and Lyn (2nd in the 2. divisjon - Group B). Djerv 1919 won and was promoted to the 1. divisjon.

Results
Lyn – Djerv 1919 0–1
Hamarkameratene – Lyn 1–1
Djerv 1919 – Hamarkameratene 3–0

Table

Season statistics

Top scorers

Attendances

References

League table
Fixtures
Goalscorers

Eliteserien seasons
Norway
Norway
1